Energia Lignitul Pandurii Târgu Jiu was a handball team from Târgu Jiu, Romania, that played in the Romanian Liga Naţională.

Kits

History
The team was founded in 1960. They were promoted in Divizia A (today Liga Națională) after the 1995-96 season of Diviza B (today Divizia A)  and played several seasons in the first league, in which they won third place two times. The team also played two finals of the Romanian Cup against HCM Constanța in 2011 and against HC Minaur Baia Mare in 2015. They competed for the first time in the 2006-2007 EHF Cup season and competed one time in the 2011-2012 season of the EHF Cup Winners' Cup.

Achievements

Domestic

Leagues
Liga Națională
Bronze: 2006, 2010
Divizia A
Gold: 1996

Cups
Cupa României
Silver: 2011, 2015
Supercupa României
Silver: 2015

European
EHF Cup
Round 2: 2006-07, 2010-11
EHF Cup Winners' Cup
Last 16: 2011-12

External links

References

Romanian handball clubs
Handball clubs established in 1960
Handball clubs disestablished in 2016
1960 establishments in Romania
2016 disestablishments in Romania
Târgu Jiu
Liga Națională (men's handball)